Carbonyl reductase [NADPH] 3 is an enzyme that in humans is encoded by the CBR3 gene.

Carbonyl reductase 3 catalyzes the reduction of a large number of biologically and pharmacologically active carbonyl compounds to their corresponding alcohols.  The enzyme is classified as a monomeric NADPH-dependent oxidoreductase.  CBR3 contains three exons spanning 11.2 kilobases and is closely linked to another carbonyl reductase gene - CBR1.

References

External links

Further reading